Álvaro Perdigão (22 May 1910 – 10 March 1994)  was a Portuguese painter.

Biography 
Álvaro Perdigão was born in May 1910, in the same year of the establishment of the Portuguese Republic. In Setubal, a small town 50 km to the south of Lisbon, he attends the Bocage Secondary School. He starts studying Art under the supervision of painter Lázaro Lozano in 1917, when he was around seventeen years old, leaving in 1929.

Álvaro Perdigão’s apprenticeship takes him to the School of Fine Arts and to the National Conservatoire, where he attends a course in scenography. Whilst studying, he holds various jobs: designer at the Fiscalization Commission for the Urban Topographic department, between 1939 and 1948.  However, he ends up dedicating most of his professional life to teaching. He is designated teacher of Technical Teaching at the Marquês de Pombal Industrial School in Lisbon, in 1948. He joins the staff of Casa Pia in Lisbon in 1950, having been invited by the school’s board to become the designated Painting Teacher, job he holds until 1980.  Meanwhile, he meets art colleagues, such as the sculptors Martins Correia, Raul Xavier and Helder Baptista, amongst others. He also engages in volunteer work, teaching evening classes at the National Society of Fine Arts.

He begins his artistic career soon enough. In 1929, at the young age of nineteen he holds his first individual art exhibition, at the Clube Naval of Setubal. From then on, he keeps regular contact with his audience. During his career, his work is shown, in Portugal and abroad, both in individual and collective exhibitions. In 1951/1952, he becomes vice president of the Board of the National Society of Fine Arts, and in 1974 he joins the Parallel Group, together with António Carmo, João Hogan, Querubim Lapa, Gil Teixeira Lopes amongst others.

Álvaro Perdigão experimented and applied various painting techniques. His work is vast, showing oil painting as the predominant technique, even though he also produced drawings, water colours, ceramics, stained glass, engravings in various materials. His art shows a large spectrum of colours - greys, blues, greens, ochers, briques, yellows, browns, reds – spread in complex structured patches on the canvas; his canvases, prepared by the artist himself, aware made of thick linen in which the application of paint enabled an embossed texture.

It is important to highlight the main topic areas, vast and diversified, which the artist explored in his life’s work: the male and female figure, the natural landscape and still lives. Through his work, the artist expressed his vision and interpretation of the life of the common man in his daily chores. 
He died in Lisbon in 1994.

Awards

Individual exhibitions 
 1929 – Clube Naval Setubalense
 1930, 1931 – Liceu Bocage
 1934 – Câmara Municipal de Coimbra 
 1936 – Galeria UP 
 1943 – Galeria Instanta, Lisboa 1951, 1961, 1962 (Monotipias e Óleos)
 1963 – Sociedade Nacional de Belas-Artes
 1961, 1969,1971 – Galeria do Casino Estoril
 1963 – Coliseu do Porto
 1962, 1985 – Museu de Setúbal
 1962, 1965 – Junta de Turismo da Costa do Sol, Estoril 
 1968 (Óleos),1969 – Galeria Nacional de Arte 1969, 1970, 1971 (xilogravura) – Museu de Angra do Heroísmo
 1969 – Galeria Interforma
 1970 – Galeria o “Primeiro de Janeiro” (pintura e gravura), Coimbra; Caves Fonseca
 1971, 1974 – Galeria do “Diário de Notícias”
 1972 – Galeria Cema, Madrid
 1973 – Clarkson Galleries, Edimburgo 
 1975 – Galeria Abel Salazar, Porto
 1976, 1979, 1983, 1987 – (o Esconderijo e outras obras, óleos e escultura em rede de arame)– Galeria S. Francisco
 1989 (Do Alto de St. Justa e outras Pinturas Mais)  – Galeria S. Francisco
 1991,1993 (Velhas e Novas Realidades) – Galeria S. Francisco
 1979 – Museu de Castelo Branco
 1991 – Primeiro Aniversário da Galeria de Arte da Casa do Pessoal da RTP
 2012 - Exposição antológica no Museu do Neo-Realismo, em Vila Franca de Xira

Art in museums 
 Biblioteca Museu Luz Soriano, Casa Pia
 Fundação Calouste Gulbenkian/C.A.M.
 Museu António Duarte, Caldas da Rainha
 Museu Armindo Teixeira Lopes, Mirandela
 Museu de Angra do Heroísmo, Ilha Terceira, Açores
 Museu de Arte Contemporânea
 Museu de José Malhoa, Caldas da Rainha
 Museu de Luanda
 Museu de Sines
 Museu de Setúbal
 Museu do Neo-Realismo
 Museu do Trabalho Michel Giacometti
 Museu Francisco Tavares Proença, Figueira da Foz
 Museu Machado de Castro
 Museu Santos Rocha, Figueira da Foz

Public institutions

International museums

External links 
Fundação Calouste Gulbenkian
Museu do Neo-Realismo
Sociedade Nacional de Belas-Artes

1910 births
1994 deaths
People from Lisbon
20th-century Portuguese painters
20th-century male artists
Portuguese male painters